Clivia nobilis, the green-tip forest lily, is a species of flowering plant in the genus Clivia, of the family Amaryllidaceae, native to South Africa. It has evergreen strap-shaped leaves, and bears pendent umbels of multiple narrow, trumpet-shaped, red and yellow flowers, tipped with green.

Like its relative C. miniata It has gained the Royal Horticultural Society's Award of Garden Merit (confirmed 2017).

Charlotte Percy (née Clive), Duchess of Northumberland (1787–1866), governess of Queen Victoria, was the first to cultivate the plant in the United Kingdom and bring it to flower. The whole genus was subsequently named after the Duchess.

References

External links
A picture of Clivia nobilis 
A picture of Clivia nobilis

Amaryllidoideae